Aleksandra Zimny (born 21 May 1996) is a Polish handball player for Storhamar HE and has played for the Polish national team.

Referencer

Polish female handball players
1996 births
Living people
Sportspeople from Szczecin
Expatriate handball players
Polish expatriates in Norway
21st-century Polish women